Finvenkismo is an ideological current within the Esperanto movement dating back to L. L. Zamenhof, the initiator of Esperanto. The name is derived from the concept of a fina venko (English: final victory) denoting the moment when Esperanto will be used as the predominant second language throughout the world. A finvenkist is thus someone who hopes for or works towards this "final victory" of Esperanto. According to some finvenkists, this "final victory" of Esperanto may help eradicate war, chauvinism, and cultural oppression.

Recently, some Esperantists have campaigned for the expression fina venko to be replaced with fina sukceso ("final success") because the former reminds some people of war due to its similarity to the German word Endsieg.

Origin
As Zamenhof created Esperanto with the goal of eventual use by everyone as a second language for international communication, finvenkismo has been around for as long as Esperanto itself. In the early days of the Esperanto movement, essentially all Esperantists were also finvenkists; however, as the Esperanto community grew, so did the diversity of ideologies among Esperantists, some of whom began to challenge the merits of finvenkismo. Thus, one could be an Esperantist without being a finvenkist at all.

Possible ways to achieve 
During the 1910 World Esperanto Congress, Zamenhof highlighted two ways that fina venko could be achieved: through diligent self-directed study of Esperanto by all people in the world, or by government action permitting or requiring Esperanto literacy to be taught in schools:

Raŭmismo and Civitanismo

Since 1980, finvenkismo encountered criticism by so-called raŭmistoj. This ideological current interprets the Esperanto community as a language diaspora, whose members should not concentrate on the propagation of the language but rather on its cultivation. The term Raŭmismo comes from the Manifesto of Rauma signed by many participants of the International Youth Congress in the Finnish town Rauma in 1980.

Soon the word Raŭmismo acquired two different meanings: According to some, a Raŭmist is just someone who uses Esperanto without propagating it. According to the more ideological Raŭmismo, a Raŭmist is someone who considers the Esperanto community a self chosen linguistic minority and supports attempts to get a state-like representation for this minority. This more ideological Raŭmismo is now often called Civitanismo, because it is the official ideology of the Esperanta Civito (Esperanto Citizens' Community), an organisation which attempts to be such a state-like representation of the Esperanto diaspora.

Even though nowadays most Esperantists highly value cultivating the language—and the proportion of Esperanto-speakers who cultivate the language without propagating it is larger than ever—the ideological Raŭmismo (Civitanismo) has isolated itself somewhat within the Esperanto community because Civitanists are perceived to spend more energy on criticising the finvenkist Esperanto movement than on cultivating Esperanto.

In response to the criticisms from Raŭmists, the finvenkist Esperanto movement has produced the Prague Manifesto, which attempts at showing the importance of finvenkismo in our modern society by emphasizing democratic communication, language rights, preservation of language diversity, and effective language education.

References

External links
Text of the Prague Manifesto in English
Esperanta Civito

Esperanto culture
Esperanto movement